Nutrilite is a brand of mineral, vitamin, and dietary supplements developed in 1934 by Carl F. Rehnborg.  Nutrilite products are currently manufactured by Access Business Group, a subsidiary of Alticor whose products are sold via Amway worldwide. The Nutrilite brand is known as Nutriway in Denmark, Finland, Norway, Sweden, Turkey, Australia and New Zealand.

History
Carl F. Rehnborg developed his vitamin products in the 1930s. His time in China between the end of 1915 and 1927 exposed him to experiences which lead him to realize the impact vitamins and nutrients have on general health.  He began selling his vitamins as the California Vitamin company. In 1939 the company was renamed Nutrilite.  In 1945, Rehnborg invented the multi-level marketing selling system to distribute his vitamins. Also in 1945 Lee S. Mytinger and William S. Casselberry became exclusive national distributors and operated a company to distribute the vitamins.

The founders of Amway, Jay Van Andel and Richard DeVos, began as independent distributors selling Nutrilite products in 1949, at a time when the product's previous distributors (Mytinger and Casselberry, Inc.) were involved in a dispute with the U.S. Food and Drug Administration (FDA), which accused them of false advertising.  Van Andel and DeVos rose rapidly, becoming top-selling distributors. Concerned about the FDA dispute, they launched a new company, the American Way, (later known as Amway), to use the multi-level marketing system for other household products.  The FDA/Mytinger-Casselberry dispute, which went to the United States Supreme Court, was resolved in favor of the FDA in the 1960s.

In 1972, Amway bought a controlling interest in the company. In 1994 they took over complete ownership.

In 2001, five Nutrilite products were the first dietary supplements to be certified by NSF International.

In 2007, the Simply Nutrilite (later renamed Nutrilite Trim Advantage Body System) line was introduced. The line includes meal replacement bars, anti-oxidant, and vitamin supplements.

Distribution and marketing
Nutrilite's vitamin and mineral products are distributed exclusively by Amway affiliates known as Independent Business Owners (IBO) in North America and 108 other countries and territories. Nutrilite also has snacks as part of its product line.(Amway, Quixtar, and Access Group are subsidiaries of Alticor).

Spokespersons for the brand have included Asafa Powell, Liu Xiang, Sanya Richards, Ronaldinho, and Jenn Stuczynski.

Reception
Nutrilite Double X was tested by ConsumerLab.com in their Multivitamin and Multimineral Supplements Review of 38 of the leading  multivitamin/multimineral products sold in the U.S. and Canada.  Double X passed ConsumerLab's test, which included testing of selected index elements, their ability to disintegrate in solution per United States Pharmacopeia guidelines, lead contamination threshold set in California Proposition 65, and meeting FDA labeling requirements.

Regulatory and safety issues

In 1948, the U.S. Food and Drug Administration seized shipments of Nutrilite, then distributed by a California firm, Mytinger & Casselberry Inc. The FDA claimed that a booklet with the product made false claims that it would cure diseases. The distributor brought suit, claiming the seizures were unconstitutional. In 1950, the U.S. Supreme Court ruled that the seizure was constitutional.

In 2009, Amway voluntarily recalled three kinds of Nutrilite energy bars due to potential contamination with salmonella after the FDA tracked the peanut butter salmonella outbreak to a Peanut Corporation of America plant, a vendor Amway had used on occasion.

References

External links
 
 From the Ground Up, c.1954 promotional Nutrilite film in the Prelinger Archives hosted at Archive.org

Alticor brands
Amway brands
Dietary supplements
Multi-level marketing products
Quixtar brands